Vicente Isabel Osorio de Moscoso y Álvarez de Toledo, 12th Count of Altamira, GE (19 November 1777 – 31 August 1837), was a Spanish peer.

Biography

Vicente Isabel was born in Madrid the 19th November 1777, son of Vicente Osorio de Moscoso y Guzmán, who was the 11th Count of Altamira. His mother was María Ignacia Álvarez de Toledo y Gonzaga, daughter of the Marquesses of Villafranca del Bierzo.

See also
List of dukes in the peerage of Spain
List of current Grandees of Spain

References

1777 births
1837 deaths